(born October 6, 1969 in Noboribetsu, Hokkaidō) is a former volleyball player from Japan, who played as a setter for the Men's National Team in the 1990s. He competed at the 1992 Summer Olympics in Barcelona, Spain. He also competed in the 1998 World Championship, where he placed 16th.

Honours

1992 Olympic Games — 6th place
1998 World Championship — 16th place

References
 Profile

1969 births
Living people
Japanese men's volleyball players
Volleyball players at the 1992 Summer Olympics
Olympic volleyball players of Japan
Asian Games medalists in volleyball
Volleyball players at the 1990 Asian Games
Volleyball players at the 1994 Asian Games
Medalists at the 1990 Asian Games
Medalists at the 1994 Asian Games
Asian Games gold medalists for Japan
Asian Games bronze medalists for Japan
20th-century Japanese people